Mandamus may refer to:

Mandamus, a legal term
Peremptory writ of mandamus
Continuing Mandamus
Mandamus  River in New Zealand
Levular Mandamus, character in Robots and Empire by Isaac Asimov